Zdzisław Wrona (born 12 January 1962) is a Polish former cyclist. He competed in the road race at the 1988 Summer Olympics.

References

External links
 

1962 births
Living people
Polish male cyclists
Olympic cyclists of Poland
Cyclists at the 1988 Summer Olympics
People from Sobótka
Sportspeople from Lower Silesian Voivodeship